Sterphus is a genus of hoverflies.

Species
Sterphus andicus Hippa, 1978
Sterphus arethusa (Hull, 1944)
Sterphus aureopila (Hull, 1941)
Sterphus aureus Hippa, 1978
Sterphus auricaudatus (Williston, 1892)
Sterphus aurifrons Shannon, 1926
Sterphus batesi (Shannon, 1926)
Sterphus calypso Hippa, 1994
Sterphus chiragra (Fabricius, 1805)
Sterphus chloropyga (Schiner, 1868)
Sterphus coarctatus (Wiedemann, 1830)
Sterphus coeruleus (Rondani, 1863)
Sterphus cybele (Hull, 1951)
Sterphus cydippe Hippa, 1994
Sterphus fascithorax (Williston, 1888)
Sterphus fassli Hippa, 1978
Sterphus fulvus Thompson, 1973
Sterphus funebris (Hull, 1944)
Sterphus gamezi Thompson, 1997
Sterphus hinei (Thompson, 1976)
Sterphus incarum Hippa, 1978
Sterphus incertus Thompson, 1973
Sterphus intermedius Thompson, 1973
Sterphus janzeni Thompson, 1994
Sterphus latitarsatus (Macquart, 1842)
Sterphus nigrita (Fabricius, 1781)
Sterphus nitidicollis Hippa, 1978
Sterphus ochripes Hippa, 1978
Sterphus panamensis (Curran, 1930)
Sterphus pilifer Hippa, 1978
Sterphus plagiatus (Wiedemann, 1830)
Sterphus rudis (Hull, 1944)
Sterphus rufoabdominalis Zumbado, 1997
Sterphus sapphirifer Hippa, 1978
Sterphus scutellata (Curran, 1934)
Sterphus shannoni Thompson, 1973
Sterphus spinosus (Shannon, 1925)
Sterphus stimulans Thompson, 1973
Sterphus telus Thompson, 1973
Sterphus tinctus (Fluke, 1951)
Sterphus transversus (Walker, 1857)
Sterphus venezuelaensis Thompson, 1994
Sterphus woodorum Thompson, 1973

References

Diptera of North America
Diptera of South America
Eristalinae
Hoverfly genera
Taxa named by Rodolfo Amando Philippi